Kosmos 163 ( meaning Cosmos 163), also known as DS-U2-MP No.2, was a Soviet satellite which was launched in 1967 as part of the Dnepropetrovsk Sputnik programme. It was a  spacecraft, which was built by the Yuzhnoye Design Office, and was used to investigate micrometeoroids and cosmic dust particles in near-Earth space.

A Kosmos-2I 63SM carrier rocket was used to launch Kosmos 163 into low Earth orbit. The launch took place from Site 86/1 at Kapustin Yar. The launch occurred at 05:03:00 GMT on 5 June 1967, and resulted in the successful insertion of the satellite into orbit. Upon reaching orbit, the satellite was assigned its Kosmos designation, and received the International Designator 1967-056A. The North American Air Defense Command assigned it the catalogue number 02832.

Kosmos 163 was the second of two DS-U2-MP satellites to be launched, after Kosmos 135. It decayed from its orbit and reentered the atmosphere on 11 October 1967.

See also

 1967 in spaceflight

References

Spacecraft launched in 1967
Kosmos satellites
1967 in the Soviet Union
Dnepropetrovsk Sputnik program